The United States Naval Institute (USNI) is a private non-profit military association that offers independent, nonpartisan forums for debate of national security issues. In addition to publishing magazines and books, the Naval Institute holds several annual conferences. The Naval Institute is based in Annapolis, Maryland.

Established in 1873, the Naval Institute claimed "almost 50,000 members" in 2020, mostly active and retired personnel of the United States Navy, Marine Corps, and Coast Guard. The organization also has members in over 90 countries.

The organization has no official or funding ties to the United States Naval Academy or the U.S. Navy, though it is based on the grounds of the Naval Academy through permission granted by a 1936 Act of Congress.

History
The U.S. Naval Institute was formed on October 9, 1873 by fifteen naval officers gathered at the U.S. Naval Academy's Department of Physics and Chemistry building in Annapolis to discuss, among other topics, the implications of a smaller post-Civil War Navy. Rear Admiral John L. Worden, former commander of the USS Monitor, served as the first president.

In 1874, the Naval Institute began to accept papers and publish the proceedings of its discussions, which were distributed to the organization's members. In 1898, the Naval Institute Press was created to publish basic naval guides. The most popular of these, The Bluejacket's Manual, is on its 25th edition, and is still issued to all enlistees of the U.S. Navy. The press eventually expanded to publish more general-interest titles in history, biography, and current affairs.

In 1992, the Naval Institute Foundation, Inc., was established to stabilize the organization's funding.

In 1999, the Naval Institute transferred its former headquarters, Preble Hall, to the Naval Academy, and renovated a derelict Navy hospital to serve as its new headquarters. The new building was named Beach Hall, after Captain Edward L. Beach Jr., author and Navy Cross recipient; and his father, Captain Edward L. Beach Sr., who had served as the institute's secretary-treasurer.

Publications and products

Proceedings
Proceedings is the Naval Institute's monthly magazine. Published since 1874, it is one of the oldest continuously published magazines in the United States. Issues include articles from military professionals and civilian experts, historical essays, book reviews, full-color photography, and reader commentary. Roughly a third are written by active duty and active reserve personnel, a third by retired military, and a third by civilians. Proceedings also frequently carries feature articles by Secretaries of Defense, Secretaries of the Navy, Chairmen of the Joint Chiefs of Staff, and top leaders of the Navy, Marine Corps and Coast Guard. The magazine has published controversial articles on contentious issues; moreover, military officials have been known to block certain articles from being submitted to the journal. For example, in 1962, the Department of Defense blocked a Marine Corps lieutenant colonel from submitting an article to Proceedings about a 1949 proposal to merge the Marines' aviation units into the Air Force.

Naval History
Naval History is the Naval Institute's bimonthly magazine. First published in 1987, its articles detail the role of sea power in U.S. history. The magazine's contributors have included historians David McCullough and James M. McPherson; former sailors, Marines and Coast Guardsmen such as Ernest Borgnine, Gene Hackman, and Douglas Fairbanks Jr.; and journalists, including Walter Cronkite and Tom Brokaw.

Naval Institute Press
The Naval Institute Press was founded in 1898 and publishes about 80 books a year. Its twice-yearly catalog includes works on history, biography, professional military education, and occasional works of popular fiction, such as Tom Clancy's first novel, The Hunt for Red October and Stephen Coonts' Flight of the Intruder. Its professional titles include The Bluejacket's Manual, Naval Shiphandling, The Naval Officer's Guide, The Marine Officer’s Guide, and The Coast Guardsman’s Manual. The Naval Institute Guide to Combat Fleets of the World and The Naval Institute Guide to Ships and Aircraft of the U.S. Fleet are popular reference books with the military, the media, and maritime enthusiasts.

USNI News
USNI News is the Naval Institute's news service. Founded in 2012, USNI News operates from Monday to Friday and primarily focuses on defense-related topics. USNI News heavily covered the Fat Leonard scandal as it developed.

Americans at War
In 2007, USNI produced Americans At War, a series of video interviews with U.S. combat veterans of conflicts dating to World War I. Former President George H. W. Bush, Senators Bob Dole, Daniel Inouye, Bob Kerrey, and others described how combat changed their lives. The series was broadcast on PBS television stations nationwide.

Archives

Photographs
The U.S. Naval Institute holds more than 450,000 images of people, ships and aircraft from all branches of the armed forces. The photographs date from the American Civil War to the present.

Oral histories
The U.S. Naval Institute's oral history program preserves the reminiscences of numerous American military figures, including USAAF General Jimmy Doolittle, Admirals Arleigh Burke and Chester W. Nimitz. The Naval Institute records a series of interviews covering the life story of each participant. The interviews are then transcribed, annotated, indexed, and bound. Since the inception of the program in 1969, more than 230 bound volumes have been completed, and interviews have been recorded to produce dozens more.

Jack C. Taylor Conference Center

On 30 September 2021, the U.S. Naval Institute dedicated the Jack C. Taylor Conference Center that features a 406-seat auditorium, reception spaces, an indoor/outdoor rooftop terrace, five unique meeting rooms, and a broadcast studio. The venue was named for Jack C. Taylor, a decorated World War II U.S. Navy fighter pilot and founder of Enterprise Rent-A-Car.

Notable members
The institute's notable current and former members include:

 Thomas Edison, inventor and businessman
 William Halsey Jr., fleet admiral
 John Lehman, former Secretary of the Navy
 John A. Lejeune, marine lieutenant general
 Alfred Thayer Mahan, naval flag officer, geostrategist, and historian
 Chester W. Nimitz, fleet admiral
 Colin Powell, statesman and a retired army general
 Theodore Roosevelt, 26th U.S. president
 Tom Clancy, author

See also
 Air & Space Forces Association
 Association of the United States Army
 Coast Guard Foundation
 Marine Corps Association
 Space Force Association
 Norman Polmar

References

External links
 
 Jack C. Taylor Conference Center

 
1873 establishments in Maryland
Naval Postgraduate School
Organizations associated with the United States Marine Corps
Organizations established in 1873
Naval Institute